Shyroke is an urban-type settlement in Khartsyzk Municipality, Donetsk Raion in Donetsk Oblast of eastern Ukraine Population:

Demographics
Native language as of the Ukrainian Census of 2001:
 Ukrainian 21.52%
 Russian 77.33%
 Armenian 0.10%

References

Urban-type settlements in Donetsk Raion